The Cooperative Institute for Arctic Research is designed to be a focal point for interactions between the National Oceanic and Atmospheric Administration (NOAA)/Office of Oceanic and Atmospheric Research (OAR) and the Arctic research community through the University of Alaska for research related to the Western Arctic/Bering Sea region.

(CIFAR) was established through a Memorandum of Understanding between NOAA and the University of Alaska. CIFAR is exclusively concerned with Arctic research. They work closely with NOAA's Arctic Research Office and the Pacific Marine Environmental Laboratory (PMEL). Partnerships with NOAA also include the National Marine Fisheries Service (NMFS), the National Ocean Service (NOS), and an emerging relationship with the National Weather Service.

External links
 Cooperative Institute For Arctic Research

Office of Oceanic and Atmospheric Research
Meteorological research institutes
Research institutes in Alaska
Oceanographic organizations
Science and technology in Alaska
University of Alaska System
Arctic research